Mendenhall Springs is a set of springs that was turned into a resort in Alameda County, California.

William M. Mendenhall established a health spa here in the 1870s, which by 1909 had accommodations for 75 people, from springs that had been diverted through tunnels originally bored for gold prospecting.

Climate
This region experiences warm (but not hot) and dry summers, with no average monthly temperatures above 71.6 °F.  According to the Köppen Climate Classification system, Mendenhall Springs has a warm-summer Mediterranean climate, abbreviated "Csb" on climate maps.

References

Reference bibliography

External links

Unincorporated communities in California
Unincorporated communities in Alameda County, California